Matachin is the second album by Bellowhead, released on 22 September 2008. Its title refers, to 'An old dance with swords, masks and bucklers; a sword dance' that may have influenced the Cotswold Morris dance. It has been described as "...a magnificently murky and rum-sodden collection of 11 traditional and original songs from the 11 piece band who defy easy categorisation".

Track listing

Personnel
Jon Boden - lead vocals, fiddle, duet-concertina
Benji Kirkpatrick - guitar, bouzouki, mandolin, banjo
John Spiers - melodeon, Anglo-concertina
Andy Mellon - trumpet
Justin Thurgur - trombone
Brendan Kelly - saxophone, bass clarinet
Gideon Juckes - Helicon
Pete Flood - percussion
Rachael McShane - cello, fiddle
Paul Sartin - fiddle, oboe
Sam Sweeney - fiddle, pipes

References

Bellowhead albums
2008 albums